Danny Lopez (born July 6, 1952) is an American former professional boxer who was the WBC featherweight champion of the world from November 1976 to February 1980. His nickname was Little Red.

Known for his tremendous punching power, in 2003 The Ring magazine rated Lopez at number 26 on their list of "100 Greatest Punchers". In 2010, Lopez was inducted into the International Boxing Hall of Fame.

Background
Lopez is of Ute Indian, Mexican, and Irish heritage. He had been moved from one foster home to another, and coming off a Ute Indian Reservation in Utah, he finally found a home in Southern California. He is also the brother of welterweight contender Ernie Lopez. He is married to Bonnie Lopez and has three sons, Bronson, Jeremy, and Dylan.

Pro career
Lopez began boxing professionally on May 27, 1971, knocking out Steve Flajole in one round at Los Angeles. He won his first 21 fights in a row by knockout, in one of the longest knockout win streaks ever. During that streak, all but one of his fights were in Los Angeles, a fact which could be credited for his popularity in the area. The only one of those 21 fights to be held outside Los Angeles took place in Honolulu, where he beat Ushiwakamaru Harada by knockout in three.

On January 17, 1974, Genzo Kurosaw became the first person to go the distance with Lopez, Lopez winning by a ten-round decision. His next fight, a month later, in Mexicali, Mexico, was his first fight abroad. He beat Memo Rodriguez by a knockout in nine rounds.

People in Los Angeles were eager to see Lopez and another up-and-coming Los Angeleno, Bobby Chacon, square off inside a ring. The fight took place on May 24, and Lopez was knocked out in the ninth round in a thrilling fight. In his next fight of note, he lost once again by a knockout in round nine, this time to Shig Furuyama.

After losing to Octavio Gómez to begin 1975, Lopez went on a roll, beginning with a knockout of Chucho Castillo in two rounds. Two more wins, and he was faced with Rubén Olivares, whom he beat by a knockout in seven rounds, after recovering from a first round knockdown himself.

In 1976, he beat Sean O'Grady by knockout in four, Gómez by knockout in three and Art Hafey by knockout in seven. Finally ranked number one by the WBC, he travelled to Ghana to challenge world Featherweight champion David Kotei in front of an estimated crowd of more than 100,000 Kotei partisans. Lopez became world champion by outpointing Kotei over 15 rounds on November 6. Due to all communication systems having been cut down in Ghana, Lopez could not get his message through to his family; they only learned he was World Champion when they picked him up at the airport one week later.

Lopez won three fights in 1977, retaining the title once, against José Torres by a knockout in round seven.

He and Kotei had a rematch on February 15 of 1978, as part of the undercard where Leon Spinks dethroned Muhammad Ali of the world Heavyweight title. Lopez knocked Kotei out in round six of their rematch, and then he retained the title against Jose DePaula by knockout in round six, and Juan Malvares (on the undercard where Ali regained the title from Spinks) by knockout in two, after recovering from a first round knockdown himself. On October 21, he had a fight with Fel Clemente, against whom he retained the world title with a four-round disqualification in Italy.

By the end of 1978, there was much talk of a "super-fight" against world Jr. Featherweight champion Wilfredo Gómez, but the bout never materialized.

His fight on March 10 of 1979 against Spain's Roberto Castañón in Salt Lake City, not only marked the first time he defended his world title in his home-state, but the first time he fought in his home-state as a professional period. He retained the crown with a two-round knockout. On June 17, 1979, at San Antonio, Lopez defeated Mike Ayala with a thrilling 15th-round knockout and retained his WBC Featherweight title for the seventh time; the exciting bout would be recognized by Ring Magazine as its Fight of the Year for 1979.
Lopez went on to defend the title once more that year, knocking out Jose Caba in three rounds.

Lopez's reign as world champion came to an end on February 2, 1980, at the Arizona Veterans Memorial Coliseum in Phoenix. He met Salvador Sánchez that day, and he lost by knockout in round 13 in a one-sided affair. A rematch was fought on June 21, in Las Vegas, and that time around, Lopez was knocked out in the 14th round. He announced his retirement after that fight.

In 1985, he talked about a comeback, but decided to delay until 1992, when he was 40 years old. He lost that bout via TKO.

His record was 42 wins and 6 losses, with 39 wins by knockout.

In June 2010, Lopez and 12 other boxing personalities were inducted in the International Boxing Hall of Fame.

Life After Boxing
After his final bout, Lopez was the object of various dedications and was active on the autograph signing circuit. He returned to live in Utah full-time, then moved to Los Angeles, where he worked as a construction worker. Today he lives in Chino Hills, California.

Professional boxing record

Honors
Inducted into the California Boxing Hall of Fame – 2005
Inducted into the International Boxing Hall of Fame – 2010

|-

|-

See also
Lineal championship
List of WBC world champions

References

External links
 
 

1952 births
Living people
20th-century Native Americans
21st-century Native Americans
American boxers of Mexican descent
American male boxers
American people of Irish descent
American people of Native American descent
Boxers from Utah
Featherweight boxers
International Boxing Hall of Fame inductees
Native American boxers
People from Uintah County, Utah
Ute people
World boxing champions
Native American people from Utah